"Changed the Locks" is a song written and performed by American singer-songwriter Lucinda Williams. It was released in 1989 as the first single from her third album, Lucinda Williams (1988).

Tom Petty and the Heartbreakers covered the song on the soundtrack album Songs and Music from "She's the One" (1996), and it reached No. 20 on the Mainstream Rock chart.

Critical reception
Country music website Holler listed "Changed the Locks" as No. 3 of the best Lucinda Williams songs; "Over the course of this slow burner from her self-titled release, Lucinda rises from the depths of debilitation of abuse to finally face her offender. With surmounting strength, the artist reclaims her power with every boot-stomping verse. Contagious rock tones spur solidarity for listeners who have struggled to take the steps detailed throughout the anthem." LA Weekly ranked  it at No. 11 on their list of Williams' best 11 songs, calling it "one of her most hard hitting numbers", writing "Her sneering vocal performance fits the song's ill-tempered mood." NPR described it as a "barn burner", while music website Return of Rock ranked it No. 1 on their list of Williams' 12 songs.

Track listing
7" single
 "Changed The Locks" – 3:39
 "Goin' Back Home" – 3:22

Tom Petty and the Heartbreakers version
AllMusic's Stephen Thomas Erlewine called Tom Petty and the Heartbreakers version an "excellent cover, performed with affection and vigor."

Track listing
CD single
 "Change The Locks" – 4:56

Chart performance

Williams version

Petty version

References

External links
, official audio (no music video)
, official audio (no music video)

1989 songs
1989 singles
1996 singles
Lucinda Williams songs
Songs written by Lucinda Williams
Tom Petty songs
Rough Trade Records singles
Warner Records singles